Mir Sikandar Ali is a Pakistani politician who is member-elect of the Provincial Assembly of the Balochistan.

References

Living people
Balochistan Awami Party MPAs (Balochistan)
Year of birth missing (living people)